Sebastiano Valenti (died 1553) was a Roman Catholic prelate who served as Bishop of Terni (1520–1553).

Biography
On 5 December 1520, Sebastiano Valenti was appointed by Pope Leo X as Bishop of Terni. 
He served as Bishop of Terni until his death in 1553.

References

External links and additional sources
 (for Chronology of Bishops) 
 (for Chronology of Bishops) 

16th-century Italian Roman Catholic bishops
1553 deaths
Bishops appointed by Pope Leo X